Anthony Alastair Johnstone (born 2 May 1956) is a Zimbabwean professional golfer.

Johnstone was born in Bulawayo, Rhodesia and attended Christian Brothers College. He lives in Sunningdale in England. He turned professional in 1979 and has spent his career playing mainly on the Southern African Sunshine Tour and in Europe. He won six times on the European Tour and finished a career best seventh on the European Tour Order of Merit in 1992. His most prestigious win came at the 1992 British PGA Championship. He won seventeen times on the Sunshine Tour, including one co-sanctioned event also included in his European Tour win tally, and he topped that tour's Order of Merit in 1988–89 and 1993–94. He has represented Zimbabwe in international competition many times.

In 2004 Johnstone was diagnosed with multiple sclerosis, possibly ending his playing career. With a revolutionary drug treatment, he appears to have put his MS in remission and made his European Seniors Tour debut shortly after turning fifty in 2006. In 2008 he won his first EST event, the Jersey Seniors Classic. He won his second event on the Senior tour in 2009 at the Travis Perkins plc Senior Masters.

Johnstone is noted for his excellent short game and topped the European Tour's short game statistics in 1998, 1999 and 2000. He has also worked as a golf broadcaster.

Television work
Johnstone currently works for Sky Sports as golf commentator. He was also a presenter for a television series called Bush Hacking. Three seasons were produced which were filmed in the Kruger Park and Shamwari in South Africa. The two minute episodes were broadcast as fillers during live golf coverage on Sky Sports and also broadcast on SuperGolf on SuperSport.

Professional wins (25)

European Tour wins (6)

1Co-sanctioned by the Sunshine Tour

European Tour playoff record (1–4)

Sunshine Tour wins (17)
1984 South African Open, Charity Classic, South African Masters
1986 Goodyear Classic
1987 ICL International, Minolta Copiers Match Play, Wild Coast Classic
1988 ICL International, Minolta Copiers Match Play, Bloemfontein Classic
1989 South African PGA Championship
1990 Palabora Classic
1993 South African Masters, Zimbabwe Open, Philips South African Open (Dec.)
1994 Bell's Cup
1998 Alfred Dunhill South African PGA Championship1
1Co-sanctioned by the European Tour

Other wins (1)

European Senior Tour wins (2)

Results in major championships

CUT = missed the half-way cut (3rd round cut in 1982 Open Championship)
"T" indicates a tie for a place

Team appearances
Amateur
Eisenhower Trophy (representing Rhodesia): 1976

Professional
Hennessy Cognac Cup (representing the Rest of the World): 1982
Alfred Dunhill Cup (representing Zimbabwe): 1993, 1994, 1995, 1996, 1997, 1998, 1999, 2000
World Cup (representing Zimbabwe): 1994, 1995, 1996, 1997, 1998, 1999, 2000, 2001
Alfred Dunhill Challenge (representing Southern Africa): 1995 (winners)

References

External links

Zimbabwean male golfers
European Tour golfers
Sunshine Tour golfers
European Senior Tour golfers
Golf writers and broadcasters
Alumni of Christian Brothers College, Bulawayo
Sportspeople from Bulawayo
People from Sunningdale
1956 births
Living people